Ludgershall was a parliamentary borough in Wiltshire, England, which elected two Members of Parliament (MPs) to the House of Commons from 1295 until 1832, when the borough was abolished by the Great Reform Act.

The population was 535 in 1831.

Members of Parliament

1295–1640

1640–1832

Sources 
 Robert Beatson, A Chronological Register of Both Houses of Parliament (London: Longman, Hurst, Res & Orme, 1807)
 Cobbett's Parliamentary history of England, from the Norman Conquest in 1066 to the year 1803 (London: Thomas Hansard, 1808)
 J E Neale, The Elizabethan House of Commons (London: Jonathan Cape, 1949)
 J Holladay Philbin, Parliamentary Representation 1832  – England and Wales (New Haven: Yale University Press, 1965)
 Henry Stooks Smith, "The Parliaments of England from 1715 to 1847" (2nd edition, edited by FWS Craig – Chichester: Parliamentary Reference Publications, 1973)

Notes and references 

Parliamentary constituencies in Wiltshire (historic)
Constituencies of the Parliament of the United Kingdom established in 1295
Constituencies of the Parliament of the United Kingdom disestablished in 1832
Rotten boroughs
Members of Parliament for Ludgershall